Qeshlaq-e Qabaleh Gah Allah Vardi va Paper (also Romanized as Qeshlāq-e Qabaleh Gāh Allah Verdī va Pāper) is a village in Qeshlaq-e Gharbi Rural District, Aslan Duz District, Parsabad County, Ardabil Province, Iran. At the 2006 census, its population was 58, in 14 families.

References 

Towns and villages in Parsabad County